The Philippe Chatrier Award is an annual International Tennis Federation (ITF) award. It was introduced in 1996 to recognise individuals or organisations considered to have made outstanding contributions to tennis globally, both on and off the court.

The award is the ITF's highest honour and is named after the former French tennis player Philippe Chatrier, who was President of the governing body between 1977-1991.

The recipient receives the award at the ITF World Champions' Dinner, which takes place annually in Paris during the French Open.

List of recipients 
Below is a full list of previous recipients of the award:-
 1996:  Stefan Edberg
 1997:  Chris Evert
 1998:  Rod Laver
 1999:  Nicola Pietrangeli
 2000:  Juan Antonio Samaranch
 2001:  NEC
 2002:  Jack Kramer
 2003:  Billie Jean King
 2004:  Yannick Noah
 2005:  Tony Trabert
 2006:  Margaret Court
 2007:  John McEnroe
 2008:  Neale Fraser
 2009:  Martina Navratilova
 2010:  Gustavo Kuerten
 2011:  Guy Forget
 2012:  Arantxa Sanchez Vicario
 2013:  All England Lawn Tennis Club
 2014:  Todd Woodbridge and Mark Woodforde
 2015:  Mary Carillo
 2016:  Brad Parks
 2017:  Sergio Casal and Emilio Sanchez
 2018:  Evonne Goolagong Cawley
 2019:  Gabriela Sabatini
 2020:  Manolo Santana and  Fred Stolle

References 

International Tennis Federation
21st-century awards
Tennis awards